"2AM" is a song by American experimental rock band Bear Hands. The song was released in early 2016 as the promotional single from the band's third album, You'll Pay for This, and peaked at number 12 on the Billboard Alternative Songs chart.

Commercial performance
The song was the third song by the band to chart, reaching number 12 on the Billboard Alternative Songs chart.

Charts

Weekly charts

Year-end charts

Release history

References

2016 songs
2016 singles
Bear Hands songs